Elvar Már Friðriksson (born 11 November 1994) is an Icelandic professional basketball player for Rytas Vilnius of the Lithuanian Basketball League (LKL). He is also a member of the Icelandic national basketball team. He has twice been named to the Icelandic Úrvalsdeild Domestic All-First team as a member of Njarðvík. In 2020, he won the Swedish championship with Borås Basket. In 2021, he was named the 
Lithuanian Basketball League MVP after leading the league in assists. He was named the Icelandic Male Basketball Player of the Year in 2021 and 2022.

Playing career

First seasons with Njarðvík
Elvar started his playing career with Njarðvík in the Icelandic top-tier Úrvalsdeild karla in 2011, averaging 11.5 points and 4.6 assists during the regular season. He upped his averages to 19.1 points and 4.7 assist the following season and to 21.5 points and 7.2 assists in 2013–2014, being named to the Úrvalsdeild Domestic All-First team both times.

Long Island University
Following his strong performance, Elvar agreed to join Long Island University where he played alongside Martin Hermannsson with the LIU Sharks basketball team.

Barry University
The following season, Elvar transferred to Barry University where he played until 2018. In March 2018, he was selected as the Sunshine State Conference Player of the Year for the second consecutive year after averaging 20.0 points and 7.3 assists per game.

Denain Voltaire
In June 2018, Elvar Már joined Denain Voltaire of the LNB Pro B. On 5 November 2018, it was reported that Denain Voltaire planned to release him to make room on the roster for another signing.

Back to Njarðvík
After being released by Denain during a roster overhaul, Elvar signed with Njarðvík on 15 November 2018. On 13 December 2018, Elvar posted a triple-double in a victory against Breiðablik with 40 points, 11 rebounds and 12 assists. During the regular season, he averaged 23.1 points and 5.3 assists per game. In the playoffs, the second seeded Njarðvík was unexpectedly knocked out in the first round by ÍR.

Borås Basket
In June 2019, Elvar signed with Borås Basket of the Swedish Basketligan. In March 2020, he won the Swedish championship after the Swedish Basketball Federation decided to cancel the rest of the 2019–20 season due to the coronavirus outbreak in the country and award Borås the title as the top team at the time of the cancelation. After the season he was named the Basketligan Guard of the Year.

BC Šiauliai
On 26 July 2020, Elvar signed with BC Šiauliai of the LKL. He was named the Player of the Month for the games played in November 2020 after averaging 18.5 points and 9.5 assists per game. On 21 April 2021, he had 33 points and 11 assists, while shooting a perfect 9-of-9 from the field and 10-of-10 from the free throw line, in a 103–90 victory against BC Pieno žvaigždės. On 7 May, he had 15 points and a season high 17 assists in a double overtime loss against BC Neptūnas. Following the regular season, where he led the league in assists, he was named the Lithuanian Basketball League MVP.

Antwerp Giants
On 21 July 2021, Elvar signed with Antwerp Giants of the Belgian-Dutch BNXT League. On 16 December 2021, it was announced that he had been named the Icelandic Male Basketball Player of the Year. In February 2021, Antwerp refused an offer from Galatasaray for Elvar.

Derthona Basket
On 3 April 2022, Elvar joined Derthona Basket.

Rytas Vilnius
On 11 August 2022, Elvar signed with Rytas Vilnius. In December 2022, he was named the Icelandic Male Basketball Player of the Year for the second straight year.

National team career
Elvar played 21 games with Iceland's junior national teams from 2010 to 2013.

His first game with the senior national team was in 2013 and he was a member of Iceland's team in Eurobasket 2015 and Eurobasket 2017. Elvar was a member Iceland's team in then Games of the Small States of Europe in 2013 and 2015.

On 20 February 2021, he scored a game winning three pointer with 0.7 seconds left in a 86–84 victory against Luxembourg in the final game of the first round of the 2023 FIBA Basketball World Cup Pre-Qualifiers.

On 13 August 2021, Elvar scored a game high 30 points in a 91–70 victory against Denmark in the 2023 FIBA Basketball World Cup Pre-Qualifiers.

Personal life
Elvar is the son of former Icelandic national team player Friðrik Ragnarsson and brother of former Úrvalsdeild point guard Ragnar Helgi Friðriksson.

References

External links
 Barry Buccaneers bio
 College stats at Sports-Reference.com
 Statistics in Iceland
 RealGM.com profile

1994 births
Living people
Antwerp Giants players
Barry Buccaneers men's basketball players
Borås Basket players
Elvar Már Fridriksson
Elvar Már Fridriksson
Elvar Már Fridriksson
Elvar Már Fridriksson
Elvar Már Fridriksson
LIU Brooklyn Blackbirds men's basketball players
Elvar Már Fridriksson
Point guards
Elvar Már Fridriksson